Mucin 21, cell surface associated is a protein that in humans is encoded by the MUC21 gene.

References

Further reading 

Mucins